Abelardo Gandía Valdés (born 5 September 1977 in Requena) is a cyclist from Spain. He  has a vision impairment. He competed at the 1996 Summer Paralympics, where he did not medal. He competed at the 2000 Summer Paralympics. He finished second in the Tandem Individual Pursuit track race.

References

External links 
 
 

People from Requena-Utiel
Sportspeople from the Province of Valencia
Spanish male cyclists
Living people
1977 births
Paralympic silver medalists for Spain
Cyclists at the 1996 Summer Paralympics
Cyclists at the 2000 Summer Paralympics
Cyclists from the Valencian Community
Paralympic medalists in cycling
Medalists at the 2000 Summer Paralympics
Paralympic cyclists of Spain